Nungthel Leima is a goddess in Meitei mythology and religion. She is an adopted daughter of God Koupalu (Koubru) and Goddess Kounu. She is a wife of God Loyalakpa. She is regarded as the deity of the Khunjahanba. She is one of the incarnations of Leimarel Sidabi.

Etymology 
The name "Thoudu Nungthel Leima" (ꯊꯧꯗꯨ ꯅꯨꯡꯊꯦꯜ ꯂꯩꯃ, /tʰəu.du núŋ.tʰel lə́i.ma/) or "Thoudu Nungthen Leima" (ꯊꯧꯗꯨ ꯅꯨꯡꯊꯦꯟ ꯂꯩꯃ, /tʰəu.du núŋ.tʰen lə́i.ma/) is made up of three Meitei language words, "Thoudu Nung" (ꯊꯧꯗꯨ ꯅꯨꯡ, /tʰəu.du núŋ/), "Thel" (ꯊꯦꯜ, /tʰel/) or "Then" (ꯊꯦꯟ, /tʰen/) and "Leima" (ꯂꯩꯃ). In Meitei language (Manipuri language), "Thoudu Nung" (ꯊꯧꯗꯨ ꯅꯨꯡ, /tʰəu.du núŋ/) means "stone". This term is typically used in poems and verses.
In Meitei language (Manipuri language), "Thel" (ꯊꯦꯜ, /tʰel/) or "Then" (ꯊꯦꯟ, /tʰen/) means "to display" or "to show".
In Meitei language (Manipuri language), "Leima" (ꯂꯩꯃ, /lə́i.ma/) means "queen". The word "Leima" (ꯂꯩꯃ, /lə́i.ma/) itself is made up of two words, "Lei" (ꯂꯩ, /lə́i/) and "Ma" (ꯃ, /ma/). "Lei" (ꯂꯩ, /lə́i/) means "land" and "Ma" (ꯃ, /ma/) means "mother".

Description 
Goddess Thoudu Nungthel Leima is described as the deity of the Khunjahanba. Khunjahanba means "the first villager" or "the first citizen of a place". In Meitei language (Manipuri language), "khunja" (ꯈꯨꯟꯖꯥ, /kʰun.ja/) means "a villager". Morphologically, "khunja" (ꯈꯨꯟꯖꯥ, /kʰun.ja/) is divided into "khun" (ꯈꯨꯟ, /kʰun/) and "-ja" (ꯖꯥ, /ja/). "Khun" (ꯈꯨꯟ, /kʰun/) means "village" and "-ja" (ꯖꯥ, /ja/) literally means "offspring".
In Meitei language (Manipuri language), "Ahanba" (ꯑꯍꯥꯟꯕ, /ə.han.bə/) means "the first" or "the initial".

Mythology

Birth, adoption and naming 
Goddess Leimarel Sidabi incarnated herself as a little girl and laid herself on a stone slab in the riverbed. On the same day, God Koubru and Goddess Kounu were walking in a nearby place. God Koubru got very thirsty. So, he went down the riverside to drink water. He found the girl on the river bed. Koubru shouted three times asking if there was anyone for the baby girl. Since no one responded, Koubru and Kounu brought the girl to their divine home. The girl was adopted as their own daughter. She was given three names. She was named "Ipok Leima" ("Eepok Leima") because she was found in the stream. She was also named "Thoudu Nungthel Leima" because she was found lying on the stone slab. She was given her final name as "Taipang Nganpi" ("Taibang Nganbi") because she was beautiful as well as bright.

Husband and suitor 
Nungthel Leima is married to God Loyalakpa. However, she was once admired by God Khoriphaba. Once Khoriphaba was offered a chance by God Koubru to choose any lady of his own desire from the latter's place. Unfortunately, Goddess Nungthel Leima was chosen by Khoriphaba. But since Nungthel Leima was already married, God Koubru could not give Khoriphaba the chosen lady. Koubru did not want to take back his own words. So, he asked Khoriphaba to choose a lady once again but he should do it blindfolded. Blindfolded Khoiriphaba tried to choose but could not get Goddess Nungthel Leima. This event is enacted by the maibis in the Lai Haraoba festival till present times.

Festival 
The sacred Lai Haraoba festival is annually celebrated in honor of goddess Thoudu Nungthel Leima, besides other deities.

Cults and pantheons 
On 19 January 2018, a newly constructed temple of Ema Nungthel Leima was inaugurated at Top Siphai by Oinam Lukhoi, the then MLA of Wangoi Assembly Constituency. During the inaugural event, Oinam Lukhoi announced on the proposals to Manipur State Government to re-develop the existing sacred temples in the Wangoi AC, including other temples of goddess Nungthel Leima.

In popular culture 
Nungthel Leima Tollomkhombada Thajaba is a book written by Naoroibam Khamba. It was released on 17 January 2021.

References

Further reading 
 Tensuba, Keerti Chand (1993). Genesis of Indian Tribes: An Approach to the History of Meiteis and Thais. Inter-India Publications. 
 Khamba, Naoroibam (2021): Nungthel Leima Tollomkhombada Thajaba

External links 
 

 
Abundance deities
Abundance goddesses
Asian deities
Asian goddesses
Beauty deities
Beauty goddesses
Fortune deities
Fortune goddesses
Leima
Life-death-rebirth deities
Life-death-rebirth goddesses
Love and lust deities
Love and lust goddesses
Magic deities
Magic goddesses
Maintenance deities
Maintenance goddesses
Marriage deities
Marriage goddesses
Meitei deities
Mountain deities
Mountain goddesses
Names of God in Sanamahism
Nature deities
Nature goddesses
Peace deities
Peace goddesses